The Dr. Nash House, on U.S. Route 60 in Clay Village, Kentucky, was built in 1875.  It was listed on the National Register of Historic Places in 1988.

It is a two-story frame house with a side-passage plan layout.  Its exterior is covered with narrow weatherboard.  It has a one-story hip-roofed porch.

The listing included a second contributing building: a circular underground cellar with a concrete block entryway.

References

National Register of Historic Places in Shelby County, Kentucky
Houses completed in 1875
Houses on the National Register of Historic Places in Kentucky
1875 establishments in Kentucky
Houses in Shelby County, Kentucky
Side passage plan architecture in the United States